Logicworks is a platform driven cloud modernization, migration, and operations provider headquartered in New York City.

History

Logicworks provides end-to-end cloud solutions to AWS & Azure customers. Logicworks was founded in February 1993 as a traditional managed hosting provider specializing in complex workloads. Logicworks pivoted to provide AWS managed services in 2012 and expanded its offering on the AWS platform over time. In 2015, Logicworks achieved AWS Premier Partner status, and subsequently added Microsoft Azure Managed Services later in 2015. In December 2016, Logicworks announced that it raised $135 Million from private equity firm, Pamplona Capital, to grow its cloud reliability platform and expand its AWS & Azure offerings. In 2017, Logicworks announced support for Microsoft Azure. In June 2021, Logicworks reached $100M in revenue and launched its Cloud Reliability Platform to enhance and power its cloud operations solutions 

In February 2023, it was announced Logicworks had been acquired by the Atlanta-headquartered telecommunications and broadband company, Cox Communications.

Solutions
Logicworks provides platform driven cloud modernization, migration, and operations solutions for Amazon Web Services and Microsoft Azure cloud infrastructures. Logicworks helps customers with complex workloads to accelerate cloud migration, architect to modern standards, and operate on the cloud at scale. Logicworks Cloud Reliability platform powers its solutions to provide automation, integrated tooling, and telemetry to enable ongoing security and scale.

Compliance 
Logicworks specializes in HIPAA, PCI, HITRUST, SOC1, SOC2, and ISO 27001 compliance hosting and infrastructure design on Amazon Web Services, Microsoft Azure, and Private Cloud environments.

Notable Clients 
 3M
 Allianz
 Everly Health
 Janus Henderson
 Myriad Genetics
 Prisma Health
 ServPro

Awards
 In 2013 Logicworks was named among the "Best Places to Work in New York City" by Crain's New York Business.
 In 2014 Logicworks was ranked 9th on the "Best Places to Work in New York City" by Crain's New York Business.
 In 2014 Logicworks received VMware's Service Provider Partner of the Year Award for the Americas region.
 In 2015 Logicworks was ranked 21st on the "Best Places to Work in New York City" by Crain's New York Business.
In 2016 Logicworks was named among the "Best Places to Work in New York City" by Crain's New York Business.
In 2017, 2018, and 2019, Logicworks was included in the Gartner Magic Quadrant for Public Cloud Infrastructure Managed Service Providers, Worldwide.

References

External links
 
 Woods, Dan Buyers Beward "Private Clouds" That Aren't Clouds at All Forbes Magazine, Forbes, Inc., September 23, 2012.

Internet service providers of the United States
Web hosting
Cloud infrastructure
Cloud computing providers
Companies established in 1993